Nothofagus nuda is a species of plant in the family Nothofagaceae. It is endemic to Papua New Guinea.  It is threatened by habitat loss. N. nuda proposed to be renamed Trisyngyne nuda in 2013.

In 1927, N. nuda was reported by J. R. Croft to account for 949 deaths throughout Papua New Guinea. The plant is traditionally used as an herb in culinary dishes throughout the Puri Puri tribes of the Papua New Guinea highlands but results in hypoglycemic shock after ingestion of large doses. Croft reported that wives within the polygamous tribes of the Puri Puri used the herb to poison the patriarchs during tribal disputes that coincided with the winter solstice.

Scientists in Macao Laboratory isolated the active molecule of the plant in late 2006.

References

Nothofagaceae
Endemic flora of Papua New Guinea
Critically endangered plants
Taxonomy articles created by Polbot